Kilichundan Mampazham (Malayalam: Bird-beaked Mango) is a 2003 Indian Malayalam-language romantic comedy film written and directed by Priyadarshan from a story by Sreenivasan. It was produced by Antony Perumbavoor under the company Aashirvad Cinemas. The film stars Mohanlal, Soundarya (in her second and final Malayalam film to date), Sreenivasan, and Salim Kumar. Vineeth Sreenivasan debuted as a singer in the film.  The movie was a huge hit .

Synopsis
Moidukutty Haji returns to his village after marrying a third time. His new wife Amina is young and beautiful. His other two wives are really unhappy to see this, but they have no other choice other than to accept it. Amina was in love in with Abdu. Abdu and Usman come to the village and they come to Moidukutty Haji's house to sell bangles.

Abdu sees Amina and tries various tricks in order to get into Moidukutty Haji's house, but Moidukutty Haji drives them away. When Abdu was in Gulf, Amina's wicked father secretly stole all letters sent by Abdu by bribing the postman. Amina's marriage took place without her acceptance. Abdu with some help from his friends makes secret moves to get Amina back. The events that are going to happen from here makes the plot of the story.

Cast

 Mohanlal as Abdul Khader (Abdu)
 Soundarya as Aamina
 Sreenivasan as Moidhootty Haji
 Vindhya as Fathima (Moidhootty Haji's First Wife)
 Geetha Vijayan as Maimuna (Moidhootty Haji's Second Wife)
 Sukumari as Beeyathu (Moidhootty Haji's Mother)
 Cochin Haneefa as Kalanthan Haji
 Salim Kumar as Usman
 Jagathy Sreekumar as Irunthalakadan Nampoothiri
 T. Damodaran as Hajiyar with Kalandhan Haji
 Thilakan as Chekkutty (Amina's Father)
 Kozhikode Narayanan Nair as Musaliyar
 Baiju as Kunjahammed, Amina's youngest Paternal Uncle
 Baburaj as Hamsa(Amina's Paternal Uncle)
 Ganesh Kumar as Ummer (Amina's brother)
 Seema as Subaida (Abdu's sister)
 Abu Salim as Sulaiman, Amina's Maternal Uncle
 V K Sreeraman as Alavikkutty (Amina's Eldest Paternal Uncle)
 Poojappura Ravi as Chappuni Nair
 Santha Devi as Amina's mother
 Manka Mahesh as Wife of Chappuni Nair
 Ajayan Adoor as Salim (Moidhootty Haji's Right hand)
 Vijayan Peringode as Advocate Swami
 Nandhu as Postman Rafeeq
 Poojappura Radhakrishnan as Irundalakkadan's Helper
 C V Dev as Azees

Release 
The film was released on 11 April 2003.

Box office
The story of a man who wants his now-married lover back was not taken well by audiences. It also touched upon issues like polygamy and talaq. Hence film received mixed reviews from the critics, but it was a huge box office success.

Soundtrack 
all the music is composed by Vidyasagar and the lyrics are penned by B.R Prasad

Critical reception
Sify gave a positive review, calling it a "sparkling entertainer" and praised the performances of Mohanlal and Sreenivasan. Also adding, technically it is one of the best films in recent times, praising the cinematography, art direction, songs, lyrics, but criticized the plot in the second half.

References

External links 
 

2003 films
2003 romantic comedy films
2000s Malayalam-language films
Films with screenplays by Sreenivasan
Films scored by Vidyasagar
Films about infidelity
Films shot in Palakkad
Films shot in Ottapalam
Films shot in Thrissur
Indian romantic comedy films
Aashirvad Cinemas films
Films directed by Priyadarshan